The Battle of Tampico, also referred to as the Barradas Expedition, was a series of military engagements between the First Mexican Republic and the Spanish Empire. Fought from July to September 1829, the battle was part of several Spanish attempts to re-establish control over Mexico. The battle was a major victory for Mexico and marked the final major battle between Spain and its former colony.

Background 

During the 1810s, a series of revolts broke out in the Spanish colony of New Spain, severely damaging Spanish authority in the Colonial Mexico. Various issues had caused the rebellions, with many of the various factions eventually determining that New Spain should become independent from Spain and form a new, Mexican nation. While the Spanish Empire was initially successful in suppressing the rebellion, by the late 1810s the Mexican revolutionaries had established control over much of the country. Mexico achieved its de facto independence with the signing of the Treaty of Córdoba in 1821, but the Spanish government refused to accept the legitimacy of the treaty; Spanish military garrisons remained in Mexico until 1825, and the Spanish navy used the nearby island of Cuba as a base from which to attack Mexican shipping in the Gulf of Mexico.

As early as 1822, Spanish military commanders envisioned a reconquest of Mexico. Early plans were delayed by the liberal faction holding power in the Spanish Parliament, though by 1823 the power of the Spanish throne had been restored and invasion plans began in earnest. Potential landing points for the invasion included Veracruz, Campeche, Tampico, or the Yucatán peninsula. Invasion plans called variously for several thousand to twenty-five thousand troops and often included the addition of Spanish volunteers recently exiled from Mexico. Many Spanish planners thought that the Mexican populace would not support the Mexican government, and so disease (especially yellow fever) and distance were considered the largest obstacles for any invasion.

The order to invade Mexico was signed by Ferdinand VII in April 1829. Planning for the invasion took place over the summer months in Havana, where an invasion fleet was gathered, eventually choosing to land at the port of Tampico. Led by General Isidro Barradas, an invasion force of several warships, 15 supply ships, and 3500 men sailed from Havana on 5 July. The fleet took three weeks to sail to the Mexican coast, where it was scattered by a hurricane and landed instead in Cabo Rojo, just outside Tampico.

Mexican officials first learned of invasion rumors in early 1829 from the Mexican consulate in New Orleans. While the Spanish invasion force was inbound from Cuba, the Mexican government took efforts to strengthen its coastal defenses.

Battle
The Spanish landed on Cabo Rojo on 26 July, and by 29 July began their advance on Tampico. The army advanced north along the coast for the next several days, occasionally skirmishing with and coming under fire from Mexican forces. News of the Spanish landing reached the Mexican government on 2 August, spurring the government to call on state governors to raise militias. As the Spanish had not instituted a naval blockade, Mexican General Antonio López de Santa Anna was able to sail north from Veracruz with 1000 men to reinforce Tampico. The city of Tampico was itself evacuated by Mexican authorities to ensure the Spanish could not recruit collaborators from the town.

Barradas continued to advance into early August, winning minor skirmishes against Mexican forces and capturing Tampico Alto. The Spanish reached Tampico on 5 August and occupied the port soon after, but not before the Mexican defenders had evacuated and stripped the town of all supplies. After their withdrawal, Mexican forces consolidated in the town of Altamira to wait for more reinforcements. Santa Anna arrived on 11 August, moving the Mexican army to the mouth of the Pánuco River, just north of Tampico. On the 15th, Barradas ordered the Spanish fleet to set sail for Cuba to gather reinforcements and began to send foraging parties into the nearby countryside, resulting in skirmishes with Mexican units. The next day, 1800 Spanish soldiers advanced northwards toward Altamira in search of supplies, but their advance was hindered by Mexican skirmishers and no supplies were found at Altamira. Santa Anna counterattacked on the night of 20 August, unsuccessfully attempting to infiltrate the Spanish positions but successfully withdrawing afterward.

Mexican reinforcements continued to arrive over the next several days while the Spanish built a fort on the left bank of the Panuco river. Barradas continued to launch probing attacks into the Mexican positions, but was unable to breakout into the countryside. On 7 September a large Mexican division of 5000 men arrived to reinforce Santa Ana, while Barradas' army suffered severe attrition from disease and lack of supply. On 8 September Santa Anna requested that Barradas surrender unconditionally, which the Spanish general refused, leading to further negotiations. On the 9th a large storm disrupted both armies by flooding earthworks and causing many Mexican militiamen to desert; the next day, Santa Anna ordered an attack with his professional troops on the Spanish riverside fort, which was repulsed with 127 Mexican dead and 191 wounded compared to 104 Spanish dead and 66 wounded. At 3:00 pm that afternoon, junior Spanish officers decided to draft an instrument of surrender, which Barradas ratified. Under the terms of the surrender, the Spanish army gave up its weapons, was allowed safe passage back to Cuba, and was obliged to sign a vow not to take up arms against Mexico in the future. Barradas departed for New Orleans soon after to secure transport for the army back to Cuba, while Santa Ana was proclaimed a hero in Mexico.

Aftermath 
The battle at Tampico was the last major confrontation between the Mexican Republic and the Spanish Empire, with future Spanish invasion plans being aborted by the political situation in Spain. The victory of his army at Tampico made Santa Anna a popular hero in Mexico, a status that would influence his political career. The defeat of the expedition convinced many in Spain that Mexico was permanently lost, with one source noting that the defeat moved Spain to accept a more conciliatory stance towards Mexico.

References 

Tampico
Tampico
1829 in Mexico